Sabratha (also Sabratah, Siburata), in the Zawiya District of Libya, was the westernmost of the ancient "three cities" of Roman Tripolis, alongside Oea and Leptis Magna. From 2001 to 2007 it was the capital of the former Sabratha wa Sorman District. The extant archaeological site was inscribed as a UNESCO World Heritage Site in 1982.

Ancient Sabratha 
Sabratha's port was established, perhaps about 500BCE, as the Phoenician trading-post of Tsabratan (or). This seems to have been a Berber name, suggesting a preëxisting native settlement. The port served as a Phoenician outlet for the products of the African hinterland.
Greeks called it also Abrotonon. After the demise of Phoenicia, Sabratha fell under the sphere of influence of Carthage.

Following the Punic Wars, Sabratha became part of the short-lived Numidian kingdom of Massinissa before this was annexed to the Roman Republic as the province of Africa Nova in the 1st century BC. It was subsequently romanized and rebuilt in the 2nd and 3rd centuriesCE. The Emperor Septimius Severus was born nearby in Leptis Magna, and Sabratha reached its monumental peak during the rule of the Severans, when it nearly doubled in size. The city was badly damaged by earthquakes during the 4th century, particularly the quake of 365. It fell under control of the Vandal kingdom in the 5th century, with large parts of the city being abandoned. It enjoyed a small revival under Byzantine rule, when multiple churches and a defensive wall (although only enclosing a small portion of the city) were erected. The town was site of a bishopric. Within a hundred years of the Muslim invasion of the Maghreb, trade had shifted to other ports and Sabratha dwindled to a village.

Archaeological site

Sabratha has been the place of several excavation campaigns since 1921, mainly by Italian archaeologists. It was also excavated by a British team directed by Dame Kathleen Kenyon and John Ward-Perkins between 1948 and 1951. Besides its  that retains its three-storey architectural backdrop, Sabratha has temples dedicated to Liber Pater, Serapis and Isis. There is a Christian basilica of the time of Justinian and also remnants of some of the mosaic floors that enriched elite dwellings of Roman North Africa (for example, at the Villa Sileen, near Khoms). However, these are most clearly preserved in the colored patterns of the seaward (or Forum) baths, directly overlooking the shore, and in the black and white floors of the theater baths. There is an adjacent museum containing some treasures from Sabratha, but others can be seen in the national museum in Tripoli.

In 1943, during the Second World War, archaeologist Max Mallowan, husband of novelist Agatha Christie, was based at Sabratha as an assistant to the Senior Civil Affairs Officer of the Western Province of Tripolitania. His main task was to oversee the allocation of grain rations, but it was, in the words of Christie's biographer, a "glorious attachment", during which Mallowan lived in an Italian villa with a patio overlooking the sea and dined on fresh tunny fish and olives.

Erosion and weathering damage
According to an April, 2016 report, due to soft soil composition and the nature of the coast of Sabratha, which is mostly made up of soft rock and sand, the Ruins of Sabratha are undergoing dangerous periods of coastal erosion. The public baths, olive press building and 'harbor' can be observed as being most damaged as the buildings have crumbled due to storms and unsettled seas. As the most common building material in Sabratah, calcarenite, is highly susceptible to physical, chemical and biological weathering (particularly marine spray), the long-term conservation of the monuments is endangered. Rising sea levels can also compromise the integrity of the site.

This erosion of the coast of Ancient Sabratha can be seen yearly with significant differences in beach layout and recent crumbled buildings. Breakwaters set in the vicinity of the harbor and olive press are inadequate and too small to efficiently protect the Ancient City of Sabratha.

Modern Sabratha
The city is home to Sabratha University. Wefaq Sabratha is the football club, playing at Sabratha Stadium.

As noted in the 2021 documentary The Beatles: Get Back, directed by Peter Jackson, the Sabratha Theater was considered as a possible location where the Beatles could hold their final live concert as a group (they instead performed their last concert on the rooftop of their Apple Corps headquarters).

Climate
Sabratha has a hot semi-arid climate (Köppen climate classification BSh).

Images

Panorama

Archaeological site

Museum

References

Citations

Bibliography
 . 
 .

Further reading
 Kenrick, Philip (1986) Excavations at Sabratha 1948-1951 Malet Street: Society for the Promotion of Roman Studies, 
 Matthews, Kenneth D. (1957) Cities in the Sand, Leptis Magna and Sabratha in Roman Africa University of Pennsylvania Press, Philadelphia, 
 Reynolds, Joyce M, et al. Inscriptions of Roman Tripolitania, first edition 1952 British School at Rome/second ed. 2009 King's College London.
 Ward, Philip (1970) Sabratha: A Guide for Visitors Oleander Press, Cambridge, UK,

External links

 UNESCO archaeological site of Sabratha
 Complete photo coverage of the archeological site
 LookLex article
 IRT chapter on history and epigraphy of Sabratha
 Pleiades Gazetteer entry on ancient Abrotonum/Sabratha

 
Ancient Greek geography of North Africa
Archaeological sites in Libya
Baladiyat of Libya
National parks of Libya
Phoenician colonies in Libya
Populated places in Zawiya District
Tourism in Libya
Tripolitania
World Heritage Sites in Libya

fr:Sabratha